The Rising Sun Inn is a historic home in Anne Arundel County, Maryland, United States. It is a mid- and late-18th-century -story frame house. The earlier section dates to about 1753 and is covered with a gable roof and features a brick gable end. In the late 18th century, a frame, one-room gambrel roof wing was added to the northwest gable end of the house. Since 1916, it has been used as the headquarters of the Ann Arundel Chapter of the Daughters of the American Revolution.

The Rising Sun Inn was listed on the National Register of Historic Places in 1985.

References

External links
The Rising Sun Inn, Non-profit organization that supports the historic Inn.
, including photo from 1985, at Maryland Historical Trust

Houses on the National Register of Historic Places in Maryland
Houses in Anne Arundel County, Maryland
Houses completed in 1753
Historic American Buildings Survey in Maryland
National Register of Historic Places in Anne Arundel County, Maryland